Ho Municipal District is one of the eighteen districts in Volta Region, Ghana. Originally created as an ordinary district assembly on 10 March 1989 when it was known as Ho District, until the southern part of the district was split off by a decree of president John Agyekum Kufuor on 13 August 2004 to create Adaklu-Anyigbe District; thus the remaining part has been retained as Ho District. However on 28 June 2012, the western part of the district was later split off to create Ho West District; thus the remaining part was elevated to municipal district assembly status on that same year to become Ho Municipal District, which was established by Legislative Instrument (L.I.) 2074. The municipality is located in the central part of Volta Region and has Ho as its capital town.

Population
, the population was 177,281 with 83,819 males and 93,462 females.

History
The district's capital Ho, arose initially from a union of two villages namely, Banakoe (today Bankoe) and Hegbe (today Heve).

Villages
In addition to Ho, the capital and administrative centre, Ho Municipal District contains the following villages:

References

Sources
 
 Ho Municipal District on GhanaDistricts.com

External links
 Ho Municipal District Official Website

Districts of Volta Region